Rhodopina is a genus of longhorn beetles of the subfamily Lamiinae, containing the following species:

 Rhodopina albomaculata Gahan, 1890
 Rhodopina albomarmorata Breuning, 1958
 Rhodopina alboplagiata (Gahan, 1890)
 Rhodopina andrewesi (Breuning, 1936)
 Rhodopina assamana Breuning, 1966
 Rhodopina assamensis Breuning, 1966
 Rhodopina blairi (Gressitt, 1937)
 Rhodopina formosana (Breuning, 1954)
 Rhodopina fruhstorferi (Breuning, 1961)
 Rhodopina griseipes Breuning, 1963
 Rhodopina integripennis (Bates, 1884)
 Rhodopina japonica (Breuning, 1940)
 Rhodopina javana (Aurivillius, 1907)
 Rhodopina laevepunctata Breuning, 1958
 Rhodopina lewisii (Bates, 1873)
 Rhodopina maculosa (Pic, 1934)
 Rhodopina manipurensis Breuning, 1971
 Rhodopina meshimensis Makihara, 1980
 Rhodopina modica Komiya, 1984
 Rhodopina nasui Komiya & Kusama, 1974
 Rhodopina nilghirica (Breuning, 1939)
 Rhodopina okinawensis (Matsushita, 1933)
 Rhodopina okinoerabuana Hayashi, 1966
 Rhodopina pahangensis Breuning, 1961
 Rhodopina paraseriata Breuning, 1969
 Rhodopina parassamensis Breuning, 1975
 Rhodopina pedongensis Breuning, 1969
 Rhodopina perakensis Breuning, 1970
 Rhodopina piperita (Gahan, 1890)
 Rhodopina pubera (Thomson, 1857)
 Rhodopina pubereoides (Breuning, 1956)
 Rhodopina quadrituberculata (Aurivillius, 1920)
 Rhodopina sakishimana Yokoyama, 1966
 Rhodopina seriata (Aurivillius, 1913)
 Rhodopina seriatoides (Breuning, 1938)
 Rhodopina similis (Breuning, 1940)
 Rhodopina subuniformis Gressitt, 1951
 Rhodopina tokarensis  Hayashi, 1956
 Rhodopina tonkinensis (Breuning, 1936)
 Rhodopina tuberculicollis (Gressitt, 1942)
 Rhodopina tubericollis (Breuning, 1943)

References

 
Desmiphorini